The 2014–15 season  is Naft Tehran's 6th season in the Pro League. They will also be competing in the Hazfi Cup & AFC Champions League. Naft Tehran is captained by Alireza Ezzati.

First Team Squad
As of December 31, 2014 

For recent transfers, see List of Iranian football transfers summer 2015.

Transfers

In

Competitions

Overview

Results summary

Results by round

Matches

Hazfi Cup

Friendly Matches

Pre-season

Club

Kit 

|
|

Official sponsors
•  Petro Pars
•  Merooj
Source:

References

External links
Iran Premier League Statistics
Persian League

Naft Tehran